The 1928 United States presidential election in Montana took place on November 6, 1928 as part of the 1928 United States presidential election. Voters chose four representatives, or electors to the Electoral College, who voted for president and vice president.

Montana strongly voted for the Republican nominee, U.S. Secretary of Commerce Herbert Hoover, over the Democratic nominee, New York Governor Al Smith. Hoover won Montana by a landslide margin of 17.89%. The Republicans at this time were associated with the booming economy of the 1920s while Smith was associated with the corruption of Tammany Hall.

Results

Results by county

See also
 United States presidential elections in Montana

References

Montana
1928
1928 Montana elections